Gronops is a genus of beetles belonging to the family Curculionidae.

The genus was first described by Schönherr in 1823.

The genus has cosmopolitan distribution.

Species include:
 Gronops inaequalis
 Gronops lunatus

References

Curculionidae
Beetle genera